U2 is an Irish rock band.

U2 or U-2 may also refer to:

Arts, entertainment, media
 U2 by U2, an autobiography by the members of rock band U2
 U2 (EP), an EP by Negativland
 "U-2", a song by Iamamiwhoami
 U 2, a television channel in Karnataka, India

Biochemistry and genetics
 U2 spliceosomal RNA, a component of the spliceosome
 Urotensin 2, a cardiovascular peptide
 U2 haplogroup, a human mitochondrial DNA lineage

Computing and electronics 
 U2, a dry-cell battery type now known as a D battery
 U.2 (formerly known as SFF-8639), a connector used by some NVM Express storage devices
 Rocket U2, UniVerse and UniData database systems
 Ultima II: The Revenge of the Enchantress, a 1982 video game
 Uncharted 2: Among Thieves, a 2009 video game for the PlayStation 3

Transportation and vehicles
 German submarine U-2, one of several German submarines
 U2, a Transport for London bus route from Uxbridge to Brunel University
 Siemens-Duewag U2, a light rail vehicle

Aviation 
 Lockheed U-2, a U.S. reconnaissance aircraft
 1960 U-2 incident, an international incident involving a U.S. Lockheed U-2 over the Soviet Union
 EasyJet's IATA airline code
 Polikarpov U-2, a Soviet biplane
 Wills Wing U2, an American hang glider design
 Udet U 2, a German light aircraft

U-Bahn lines 
 U2 (Berlin U-Bahn)
 U2 (Frankfurt U-Bahn)
 U2 (Hamburg U-Bahn)
 U2 (Munich U-Bahn)
 U2 (Nuremberg U-Bahn)
 U2 (Vienna U-Bahn)

Other uses 
 The Under2 Coalition, a group of states and subnational jurisdictions committed to fighting climate change
 U2 Clothing, a casual-wear brand

 U(2), the two-dimensional unitary group
 U2, an unemployment figure released by the U.S. Bureau of Labor Statistics

See also 

 
 
 You Too (disambiguation)
 "You Two", a song from the 1968 musical film Chitty Chitty Bang Bang
 2U (disambiguation)
 UU (disambiguation)